Al-Hadi Yahya was an imam of part of the Zaidi state in Yemen. He ruled from 1217 to 1239, partly in rivalry with a contender.

Najm ad-Din Yahya bin Muhsin was a seventh-generation descendant of imam al-Mukhtar al-Qasim (d. 956). The old imam al-Mansur Abdallah died in 1217 in Kawkaban after many years of inconclusive struggles against the Ayyubids, who established a sub-branch in Yemen in 1173. After the demise of al-Mansur, the loyalties of the Zaidi community were split. People in the traditional centre of the Zaidi polity, Sa'dah, accepted Najm ad-Din Yahya as imam under the name al-Hadi Yahya. However, in the southern parts of the Zaidi land, the old imam's son Izz ad-Din Muhammad was set up as an-Nasir Muhammad. The latter died from a battle wound in 1226. Ayyubid rule in Yemen was replaced in 1229 by the Rasulid Dynasty (1229-1254). The first Rasulid Sultan, Nur ad-Din Umar I, seized several places in the highland, such as San'a, Ta'izz and Kawkaban. In 1231 he concluded peace with the Zaidi community, and there were relatively few Zaidi-Rasulid clashes until 1248. Al-Hadi Yahya died in 1239 and was buried in Saqayn. His death was followed by an interregnum of nine years until al-Mahdi Ahmad bin al-Husayn, from another branch of the Rassids, was proclaimed.

See also

 Rassids
 Imams of Yemen
 History of Yemen

References

Zaydi imams of Yemen
1239 deaths
Year of birth unknown
13th century in Yemen
13th-century Arabs
Rassid dynasty